The Collins River, New Zealand is a river of eastern Nelson, New Zealand. As a tributary of the Whangamoa River, it rises north of the Rai Saddle and flows north-westward to join that river at Whangamoa.

See also
List of rivers of New Zealand

References

Land Information New Zealand – Search for Place Names

Rivers of the Nelson Region
Rivers of New Zealand